Halogenodermas are skin eruptions that result after exposure to halogen-containing drugs or substances. This may last several weeks after drug use is discontinued. This is because of the slow elimination rate of iodides and bromides. Fluoroderma is a particular type of halogenoderma which is caused by fluoride. Fluoride is present in oral hygiene products such as toothpastes and mouth washes, hence this type of acne is seen mostly around the mouth and jawline. Acute fluoroderma has been observed in patients exposed to anaesthetics containing fluoride such as sevoflurane.

Cause

Treatment
Medications given for halogenoderma may include topical and systemic corticosteroids, diuretics, and cyclosporine.

See also
 Halogen acne
 List of cutaneous conditions

References

External links 

Drug eruptions